Northeastern University station (signed as Northeastern) is a surface-level trolley stop on the MBTA Green Line. It is located in a dedicated median along Huntington Avenue in Boston, between Opera Place and Forsyth Street, and is adjacent to the Krentzman Quad on the campus of Northeastern University. It is the first surface-level stop going outbound along the Green Line E branch; trolleys rise from a portal located between Opera Place and Gainsborough Street and continue along the surface down Huntington Avenue towards Mission Hill.

History

With the completion of the tunnel, Opera Place became an important short turn location; a siding was constructed adjacent to the inbound track. On May 21, 1947, the Boston Elevated Railway board voted to change the name from Opera Place to Northeastern University to reflect the growth of the adjacent Northeastern University. The stop was named on maps as early as the 1951, while most other surface stops did not appear separately until around 1990.

Like other surface stops on the median-reservation section of the line, Northeastern University station had bare asphalt platforms. In 1972, the MBTA began planning a reconstruction of that section of the line, then scheduled for 1973–74. The Northeastern siding was to be moved into the reservation, with a footbridge installed near the station for students. The work (minus the footbridge) were eventually done in 1980, when the line was closed to modify the track and wires for the new LRVs. The line was cut back to Symphony on March 21, 1980; it was re-extended to Northeastern (using LRVs) on June 21 and Brigham Circle on September 20. The platforms at Northeastern were lengthened and paved with brick.

In the early 2000s, the MBTA modified key surface stops with raised platforms for accessibility as part of the Light Rail Accessibility Program. The platforms at Northeastern were lengthened to Forsyth Street and repaved with concrete; temporary platforms northeast of Opera Place were used during the renovations. That renovation — part of a $32 million modification of thirteen B, C, and E branch stations — was completed on May 26, 2003. On August 23, 2004, a Type 8 Breda low-floor LRV derailed at the station, causing scarring in the outbound platform near the pedestrian crossing on the Opera Place side of the station.

References

External links

MBTA - Northeastern University
Google Maps Street View: Opera Place entrance, Forsyth Street entrance

Green Line (MBTA) stations
Railway stations in Boston
Railway stations in the United States opened in 1941
Northeastern University
Railway stations in Massachusetts at university and college campuses